The CAF 5-Year Ranking system is used by the Confederation of African Football (CAF) to determine the number of clubs that each member association may enter its club football competitions; the CAF Champions League and the CAF Confederation Cup. At present, those associations ranked in the top 12 may enter two teams into each of the two club competitions, while the remaining associations are limited to a single team in each competition.

Origins
Prior to 2004, CAF organized 3 club tournaments; the CAF Champions League, the African Cup Winners' Cup and the CAF Cup with each association allowed to enter a single team in each tournament. The Cup Winners' Cup and the CAF Cup merged to create the CAF Confederation Cup in 2004. Rather than limiting all associations to just two positions in CAF club competitions, CAF decided to allow the leading nations two entries into the then-new tournament while also allowing them an additional entry in the Champions League.

As with the UEFA rankings used for their club tournaments, the CAF rankings are based on obtained results in each of the past 5 completed club seasons. There are some differences, notably:
 More tournaments are included; the CAF Super Cup and the FIFA Club World Cup also allow teams to obtain ranking points.
 The annual results are not averaged by the number of entrants an association has, so highly ranked associations have a greater ability to obtain points.
 The ranking points are not awarded for the results of individual matches, but rather for the final level of advancement such as winners or group-stage positions.
 Only teams that advance to the quarter-final knockout stage in each club tournament can obtain ranking points.

2004 season
For the 2004 season, the rankings were made according to the performance of the associations in the previous 5 years from 1998 to 2002 in the CAF club competitions. These selected associations were as follows:

 Tunisia (36 points)
 Egypt (31 points)
 Ivory Coast (27 points)
 Morocco (24 points)
 South Africa (17 points)
 Algeria (17 points)
 Cameroon (14 points)
 Ghana (12 points)
 Angola (12 points)
 Nigeria (10 points)
 Congo DR (8 points)
 Senegal (6 points)

2005 season controversy
In July 2004, CAF informed its members that the ranking system for admission to their competitions for the 2005 season would be done according to the same 1998-2002 ranking used for the 2004 season. It is unknown why CAF did not calculate a 1999-2003 ranking (following UEFA's practice of updating its rankings each season), as there would seem to have been enough time to do this. Since then, it has become CAF's policy to adopt a year older ranking for the competitions of the new season; thus in 2012, rankings were based on results from 2006 to 2010.

2011 season change
In December 2010, CAF altered the ranking system, removing the components from the CAF Super Cup and the FIFA Club World Cup, and weighting more recent results more highly. For the 2011  edition of the club competitions, results between the 2005 and 2009 season were still in use, but the points from 2009 were multiplied by 5, 2008 by 4 and it continues in that manner.

2017 season expansion
On 30 May 2016, CAF expanded the group stage team participation in its club competitions from 8 to 16, including a quarter-final knockout stage in the process. CAF announced the ranking system based on the new format in March 2018.

2019–20 season change
On 4 June 2019, CAF announced an updated ranking for the 2019–20 season, which was to be based on results from each CAF club competition from 2015 to the first ever cross-year season of 2018–19, with Tanzania replacing Ivory Coast in the top 12 associations.

Criteria for awarding points
CAF approved its basic criteria based on the criteria used in the election of the CAF Clubs of the 20th Century in 2000 for awarding points in 2003. This was changed in 2005 with the addition of a criterion that rewards clubs that advance to the semi-finals of the FIFA Club World Cup. This methodology has also been used to create an all-time ranking for CAF clubs, adding the points that would have been obtained by each club based on its results since 1965.

For the rankings system, only results since 1998 have been counted with the CAF Super Cup and the FIFA World Cup Club excluded from the system since 2011. The table below shows the years during which the competitions were operated:

Weighting Factor
Since 2011, points have been weighted according to the year of performance results when calculating the rankings. For the current ranking, the points calculated based on performances in CAF club competitions between 2018-19 and the 2022–23 season, the points are multiplied by a coefficient according to the year as follows:
2022–23 – 5
2021–22 – 4
2020–21 – 3
2019–20 – 2
2018–19 – 1

Association Ranking for the 2022–23 CAF club season
The association ranking for the 2022–23 CAF Champions League and the 2022–23 CAF Confederation Cup was based on results from each CAF club competition from 2018 to the 2021–22 season.

Legend
 CL: CAF Champions League
 CC: CAF Confederation Cup

Association Ranking for the 2023–24 CAF club season
The association ranking for the 2023–24 CAF Champions League and the 2023–24 CAF Confederation Cup will be based on results from each CAF club competition from 2018–19 to the 2022–23 season. The standings below are as of 9 November 2022.

Legend
 CL: CAF Champions League
 CC: CAF Confederation Cup
 ≥: Associations points might increase on basis of its clubs performance in 2022-23 CAF club competitions

Club Ranking for the 2022–23 CAF club season
The club ranking is used for seeding in the 2 CAF club competitions; the CAF Champions League and the CAF Confederation Cup. Pending equality in ranking points, the team receiving more points in the previous season will be considered as the higher-ranked team.

The club ranking for the 2022–23 CAF Champions League and the 2022–23 CAF Confederation Cup was based on results from each CAF club competition from 2018 to the 2021–22 season.

Club Ranking for the 2023–24 CAF club season
The club ranking is used for seeding in the 2 CAF club competitions; the CAF Champions League and the CAF Confederation Cup. Pending equality in ranking points, the team receiving more points in the previous season will be considered as the higher-ranked team.

The club ranking for the 2023–24 CAF Champions League and the 2023–24 CAF Confederation Cup was based on results from each CAF club competition from 2018-19 to the 2022–23 season.

Legend
 ≥: Clubs points might increase on basis of its performance in 2022-23 CAF club competitions

Historical rankings since 2011

Legend
 
 — No rank 

Note: For associations which have the same number of points, they are listed as having the same rank as CAF did not publish any tiebreaking criteria. There was a tie for determining the 12th ranked association on two occasions:
In 2012, Ivory Coast received two entries in each tournament, while Angola and Zambia only received one entry in each.
In 2013, Ivory Coast received two entries in each tournament, while Libya only received one entry in each.

Club results
Club results of the previous 5 seasons and the current season based on the current points system are as follows:

If a team was disqualified, they will not obtain any ranking points. For example, ES Sétif were disqualified from the 2016 CAF Champions League during the group stage. As a result, they did not obtain a position for that tournament and thus were not counted when calculating the ranking for Algeria.

See also
 AFC Club Competitions Ranking, a similar system used by the Asian Football Confederation
 CAF Clubs of the 20th Century
 CONMEBOL club ranking of the Copa Libertadores, a similar system used by CONMEBOL
 UEFA coefficient, a similar system used by UEFA

References

External links
 The CAF 5-Year Ranking system via RSSSF
 Previous African club ranking system (Archived) via CAFOnline.com

CAF 5-Year Ranking
Association football rankings